Yerevan United Football Club or YUFC, is a defunct Armenian football club from the capital Yerevan. The club participated in the domestic competitions between 2004 and 2006.

It is currently inactive and does not participate in any of domestic leagues.

References

External links
 Official website

Defunct football clubs in Armenia
Association football clubs established in 2004
Association football clubs disestablished in 2006
Football clubs in Yerevan
2004 establishments in Armenia
2006 disestablishments in Armenia